A list of all windmills and windmill sites which lie in the current ceremonial county of Wiltshire.


Locations

Maps
1773 Andrews and Dury
1810 Andrews and Dury

Notes

Mills in bold are still standing, known building dates are indicated in bold. Text in italics denotes indicates that the information is not confirmed, but is likely to be the case stated.

References

History of Wiltshire
Windmills in Wiltshire
Lists of windmills in England
Windmills